Homo is the genus that emerged in the (otherwise extinct) genus Australopithecus that encompasses the extant species Homo sapiens (modern humans), plus several extinct species classified as either ancestral to or closely related to modern humans (depending on the species), most notably H. erectus and H. neanderthalensis. The oldest member of Homo is H. habilis with records of just over 2 million years ago. However, a recent phylogenetic study in hominins using morphological, molecular and radiometric information, dates the emergence of Homo at 3.3 Ma (4.30 – 2.56 Ma).  Homo, together with the genus Paranthropus, is probably sister to Australopithecus africanus, which itself had previously split from the lineage of Pan, the chimpanzees.

Homo erectus appeared about 2 million years ago and, in several early migrations, spread throughout Africa (where it is dubbed H. ergaster) and Eurasia. It is likely that the first human species lived in a hunter-gatherer society and was able to control fire. An adaptive and successful species, H. erectus persisted for more than a million years and gradually diverged into new species by around 500,000 years ago.

Anatomically modern humans (Homo sapiens) emerged close to 300,000 to 200,000 years ago, in Africa, and H. neanderthalensis emerged around the same time in Europe and Western Asia. H. sapiens dispersed from Africa in several waves, from possibly as early as 250,000 years ago, and certainly by 130,000 years ago, the so-called Southern Dispersal beginning about 70–50,000 years ago leading to the lasting colonisation of Eurasia and Oceania by 50,000 years ago. Both in Africa and Eurasia, H. sapiens met with and interbred with archaic humans. Separate archaic (non-sapiens) human species are thought to have survived until around 40,000 years ago (Neanderthal extinction).

Names and taxonomy 

The Latin noun homō (genitive hominis) means "human being" or "man" in the generic sense of "human being, mankind". The binomial name Homo sapiens was coined by Carl Linnaeus (1758). Names for other species of the genus were introduced beginning in the second half of the 19th century (H. neanderthalensis 1864, H. erectus 1892).

Even today, the genus Homo has not been strictly defined. Since the early human fossil record began to slowly emerge from the earth, the boundaries and definitions of the genus Homo have been poorly defined and constantly in flux. Because there was no reason to think it would ever have any additional members, Carl Linnaeus did not even bother to define Homo when he first created it for humans in the 18th century. The discovery of Neanderthal brought the first addition.

The genus Homo was given its taxonomic name to suggest that its member species can be classified as human. And, over the decades of the 20th century, fossil finds of pre-human and early human species from late Miocene and early Pliocene times produced a rich mix for debating classifications. There is continuing debate on delineating Homo from Australopithecus—or, indeed, delineating Homo from Pan. Even so, classifying the fossils of Homo coincides with evidence of: (1) competent human bipedalism in Homo habilis inherited from the earlier Australopithecus of more than four million years ago, as demonstrated by the Laetoli footprints; and (2) human tool culture having begun by 2.5 million years ago.

From the late-19th to mid-20th centuries, a number of new taxonomic names including new generic names were proposed for early human fossils; most have since been merged with Homo in recognition that Homo erectus was a single species with a large geographic spread of early migrations. Many such names are now dubbed as "synonyms" with Homo, including Pithecanthropus, Protanthropus, Sinanthropus, Cyphanthropus, Africanthropus,<ref>"African man", used by T.F. Dreyer (1935) for the Florisbad Skull he found in 1932 (also Homo florisbadensis or Homo helmei). Also the genus suggested for a number of archaic human skulls found at Lake Eyasi by Weinert (1938). Leaky, Journal of the East Africa Natural History Society' (1942), p. 43.</ref> Telanthropus, Atlanthropus, and Tchadanthropus.

Classifying the genus Homo into species and subspecies is subject to incomplete information and remains poorly done. This has led to using common names ("Neanderthal" and "Denisovan"), even in scientific papers, to avoid trinomial names or the ambiguity of classifying groups as incertae sedis (uncertain placement)—for example, H. neanderthalensis vs. H. sapiens neanderthalensis, or H. georgicus vs. H. erectus georgicus. Some recently extinct species in the genus Homo have only recently been discovered and do not as yet have consensus binomial names (see Denisova hominin). Since the beginning of the Holocene, it is likely that Homo sapiens (anatomically modern humans) has been the only extant species of Homo.

John Edward Gray (1825) was an early advocate of classifying taxa by designating tribes and families. Wood and Richmond (2000) proposed that Hominini ("hominins") be designated as a tribe that comprised all species of early humans and pre-humans ancestral to humans back to after the chimpanzee-human last common ancestor; and that Hominina be designated a subtribe of Hominini to include only the genus Homo — that is, not including the earlier upright walking hominins of the Pliocene such as Australopithecus, Orrorin tugenensis, Ardipithecus, or Sahelanthropus. Designations alternative to Hominina existed, or were offered: Australopithecinae (Gregory & Hellman 1939) and Preanthropinae (Cela-Conde & Altaba 2002); and later, Cela-Conde and Ayala (2003) proposed that the four genera Australopithecus, Ardipithecus, Praeanthropus, and Sahelanthropus be grouped with Homo within Hominini (sans Pan).

Evolution

Australopithecus and the appearance of Homo

Several species, including Australopithecus garhi, Australopithecus sediba, Australopithecus africanus, and Australopithecus afarensis, have been proposed as the ancestor or sister of the Homo lineage. These species have morphological features that align them with Homo, but there is no consensus as to which gave rise to Homo.

Especially since the 2010s, the delineation of Homo in Australopithecus has become more contentious. Traditionally, the advent of Homo has been taken to coincide with the first use of stone tools (the Oldowan industry), and thus by definition with the beginning of the Lower Palaeolithic. But in 2010, evidence was presented that seems to attribute the use of stone tools to Australopithecus afarensis around 3.3 million years ago, close to a million years before the first appearance of Homo. LD 350-1, a fossil mandible fragment dated to 2.8 Mya, discovered in 2013 in Afar, Ethiopia, was described as combining "primitive traits seen in early Australopithecus with derived morphology observed in later Homo. Some authors would push the development of Homo close to or even past 3 Mya. This finds support in a recent phylogenetic study in hominins that by using morphological, molecular and radiometric information, dates the emergence of Homo at 3.3 Ma (4.30 – 2.56 Ma).   Others have voiced doubt as to whether Homo habilis should be included in Homo, proposing an origin of Homo with Homo erectus at roughly 1.9 Mya instead.

However, a steady rise in cranial capacity is observed already in Autralopithecina and does not terminate after the emergence of Homo, so that it does not serve as an objective criterion to define the emergence of the genus.

 Homo habilis Homo habilis emerged about 2.1 Mya. Already before 2010, there were suggestions that H. habilis should not be placed in genus Homo but rather in Australopithecus. The main reason to include H. habilis in Homo, its undisputed tool use, has become obsolete with the discovery of Australopithecus tool use at least a million years before H. habilis. Furthermore, H. habilis was long thought to be the ancestor of the more gracile Homo ergaster (Homo erectus). In 2007, it was discovered that H. habilis and H. erectus coexisted for a considerable time, suggesting that H. erectus is not immediately derived from H. habilis but instead from a common ancestor. With the publication of Dmanisi skull 5 in 2013, it has become less certain that Asian H. erectus is a descendant of African H. ergaster which was in turn derived from H. habilis. Instead, H. ergaster and H. erectus appear to be variants of the same species, which may have originated in either Africa or Asia and widely dispersed throughout Eurasia (including Europe, Indonesia, China) by 0.5 Mya.

 Homo erectus Homo erectus has often been assumed to have developed anagenetically from H. habilis from about 2 million years ago. This scenario was strengthened with the discovery of Homo erectus georgicus, early specimens of H. erectus found in the Caucasus, which seemed to exhibit transitional traits with H. habilis. As the earliest evidence for H. erectus was found outside of Africa, it was considered plausible that H. erectus developed in Eurasia and then migrated back to Africa. Based on fossils from the Koobi Fora Formation, east of Lake Turkana in Kenya, Spoor et al. (2007) argued that H. habilis may have survived beyond the emergence of H. erectus, so that the evolution of H. erectus would not have been anagenetically, and H. erectus would have existed alongside H. habilis for about half a million years, during the early Calabrian.

A separate South African species Homo gautengensis has been postulated as contemporary with H. erectus in 2010.

 Phylogeny 

A taxonomy of Homo within the great apes is assessed as follows, with Paranthropus and Homo emerging within Australopithecus (shown here cladistically granting Paranthropus, Kenyanthropus, and Homo). The exact phylogeny within Australopithecus is still highly controversial. Approximate radiation dates of daughter clades are shown in millions of years ago (Mya). Graecopithecus, Sahelanthropus, Orrorin, possibly sisters to Australopithecus, are not shown here. Note that the naming of groupings is sometimes muddled as often certain groupings are presumed before any cladistic analysis is performed.

Several of the Homo lineages appear to have surviving progeny through introgression into other lines. Genetic evidence indicates an archaic lineage separating from the other human lineages 1.5 million years ago, perhaps H. erectus, may have interbred into the Denisovans about 55,000 years ago. Fossil evidence shows H. erectus s.s. survived at least until 117,000 yrs ago, and the even more basal H. floresiensis survived until 50,000 years ago. A 1.5-million-year H. erectus-like lineage appears to have made its way into modern humans through the Denisovans and specifically into the Papuans and aboriginal Australians. The genomes of non-sub-Saharan African humans show what appear to be numerous independent introgression events involving Neanderthal and in some cases also Denisovans around 45,000 years ago. The genetic structure of some sub-Saharan African groups seems to be indicative of introgression from a west Eurasian population some 3,000 years ago.

Some evidence suggests that Australopithecus sediba could be moved to the genus Homo, or placed in its own genus, due to its position with respect to e.g. H. habilis and H. floresiensis.

 Dispersal 

By about 1.8 million years ago, H. erectus is present in both East Africa (H. ergaster) and in Western Asia (H. georgicus). The ancestors of Indonesian H. floresiensis may have left Africa even earlier.Homo erectus and related or derived archaic human species over the next 1.5 million years spread throughout Africa and Eurasia (see: Recent African origin of modern humans). Europe is reached by about 0.5 Mya by Homo heidelbergensis.Homo neanderthalensis and H. sapiens develop after about 300 kya. Homo naledi is present in Southern Africa by 300 kya.H. sapiens soon after its first emergence spread throughout Africa, and to Western Asia in several waves, possibly as early as 250 kya, and certainly by 130 kya. In July 2019, anthropologists reported the discovery of 210,000 year old remains of a H. sapiens and 170,000 year old remains of a H. neanderthalensis in Apidima Cave, Peloponnese, Greece, more than 150,000 years older than previous H. sapiens finds in Europe.

Most notable is the Southern Dispersal of H. sapiens around 60 kya, which led to the lasting peopling of Oceania and Eurasia by anatomically modern humans. H. sapiens interbred with archaic humans both in Africa and in Eurasia, in Eurasia notably with Neanderthals and Denisovans.

Among extant populations of H. sapiens, the deepest temporal division is found in the San people of Southern Africa, estimated at close to 130,000 years, or possibly more than 300,000 years ago. Temporal division among non-Africans is of the order of 60,000 years in the case of Australo-Melanesians. Division of Europeans and East Asians is of the order of 50,000 years, with repeated and significant admixture events throughout Eurasia during the Holocene.

Archaic human species may have survived until the beginning of the Holocene, although they were mostly extinct or absorbed by the expanding H. sapiens populations by 40 kya (Neanderthal extinction).

 List of lineages 

The species status of H. rudolfensis, H. ergaster, H. georgicus, H. antecessor, H. cepranensis, H. rhodesiensis, H. neanderthalensis, Denisova hominin, and H. floresiensis remain under debate. H. heidelbergensis and H. neanderthalensis are closely related to each other and have been considered to be subspecies of H. sapiens.

There has historically been a trend to postulate new human species based on as little as an individual fossil. A "minimalist" approach to human taxonomy recognizes at most three species, H. habilis (2.1–1.5 Mya, membership in Homo questionable), H. erectus (1.8–0.1 Mya, including the majority of the age of the genus, and the majority of archaic varieties as subspecies, including H. heidelbergensis as a late or transitional variety) and Homo sapiens (300 kya to present, including H. neanderthalensis and other varieties as subspecies). "Species" does in this context not necessarily mean that hybridization and introgression were impossible at the time. However, it is often used as a convenient term, but it should be taken to mean to be a generic lineage at best, and clusters at worst. In general definitions and methodology of "species" delineation criteria are not generally agreed upon in anthropology or paleontology. Indeed, mammals can typically interbreed for 2 to 3 million years or longer, so all contemporary "species" in the genus Homo would potentially have been able to interbreed at the time, and introgression from beyond the genus Homo can not a priori be ruled out. It has been suggested that H. naledi may have been a hybrid with a late surviving Australipith (taken to mean beyond Homo, ed.), despite the fact that these lineages generally are regarded as long extinct. As discussed above, many introgressions have occurred between lineages, with evidence of introgression after separation of 1.5 million years.

 See also 

 List of human evolution fossils (with images)''
 Multiregional origin of modern humans

Footnotes

References

Bibliography

External links 

 Exploring the Hominid Fossil Record (Center for the Advanced Study of Hominid Paleobiology at George Washington University)
 Hominid species
 Prominent Hominid Fossils
 Mikko's Phylogeny archive
 
 Human Timeline (Interactive) – Smithsonian, National Museum of Natural History (August 2016).

Hominina
Primate genera
Human evolution
Taxa named by Carl Linnaeus
Mammal genera with one living species